A chess player is someone who plays the game of chess.

Chess player or Chess Players may also refer to:
 Chess Player (TV series), or Go Player, 2006 Chinese TV series
 Chess Player's Chronicle, a 19th-century British chess magazine
 The Chess Player (Le Joueur d'échecs), a 1927 film directed by Raymond Bernard
 The Chess Player (1938 film), a French historical drama film
 The Chess Players (painting by Daumier), c. 1863-1867 painting by Honoré Daumier
 The Chess Players (painting by Eakins), 1876 painting by Thomas Eakins
 The Chess Players (painting by Favén), 1913 painting by Antti Favén
 The Chess Players (film), a 1977 film directed by Satyajit Ray
 The Chess Players (sculpture), a 1983 sculpture by Lloyd Lillie in Washington, D.C., United States